Vivek Singh (born May 6, 1961) is an Anglo Indian celebrity chef, restaurateur, and media personality known for his Indian cuisine. He is the CEO and Executive Chef of four London based modern restaurants and one Oxford based modern restaurant. Singh is a regular face on BBC's Saturday Kitchen, and he has been featured on television shows including Madhur Jaffrey's Curry Nation, At Home with Rachel Allen, NDTV Good Times – Will Travel for Food and My Kitchen Rules UK.

Early life
Singh grew up in a coal-mining community in Bengal where his father worked as an Engineer. He attended a Christian Brothers school in Asansol called St. Patrick's Higher Secondary School 
Like most traditional Indian families, it was expected that Singh would follow his father's footsteps and go on to become an engineer. Instead, he announced that he wanted to become a "Chef".

Career

Singh went to catering college at The Institute of Hotel Management in New Delhi from 1990–1993 and was selected to join the Oberoi Centre for Learning and Development that year. In 1995, having completed three years of training at The Oberoi, The Oberoi Maidens and the Delhi Oberoi flight services, Singh was offered the job of running the kitchen at The Oberoi flight services in Mumbai. Following this, Singh joined the five-star Oberoi Grand in Kolkata. In 1997, Singh took over the running of Gharana, an Indian restaurant specialising in the cuisine of India's Royal Courts. The following year, he became the Indian chef at RajVilas in Jaipur. 

Singh met PR guru Iqbal Wahhab, at a wedding reception at Rajvilas hotel and talked about Indian food using French cooking methods. They opened their first flagship restaurant, The Cinnamon Club, in London in March 2001. On January 21, 2015, Singh received an honorary doctorate from the University of Warwick for his contribution to the development of Indian cuisine in the United Kingdom.

Cookbooks

Restaurants

The Cinnamon Club – In 2001, Singh opened his first Indian restaurant, The Cinnamon Club in London. The Cinnamon Club is awarded as one of the "Best Indian Restaurants" by squaremeal Food guide in London, UK.

Cinnamon Kitchen & Anise – Food critic and writer Fay Maschler called Vivek Singh "a gifted cook creating striking and exciting dishes" when he opened his second restaurant Cinnamon Kitchen & Anise in 2008.

Cinnamon Soho – In 2012, Singh opened his third restaurant, Cinnamon Soho, and published his fourth cookery book, Cinnamon Kitchen: The Cookbook. "Singh is a master of flavour" & "highly innovative", said Guy Dimond, food critic at Time Out.

Cinnamon Bazaar – This restaurant inspired by the hustle and bustle of bazaars in antiquity and of modern days opened in 2016 in Covent Garden. In 2017 it gained a Bib Gourmand from Michelin for its high-quality but affordable food.
Cinnamon Kitchen Oxford – In 2017 this fifth restaurant part of the Cinnamon Collection opened its doors. This is Singh's first restaurant in the UK that is located outside of London.

Public appearances

 In 2006, Singh was invited to Hangar 7 in Salzburg, Austria. Singh is the only Indian chef to be invited to Hangar 7, where he worked side by side with Chef Eckart Witzigmann and Roland Trettl. 
 In 2007, Singh helped recreate an Indian-inspired sausage based on Daljit Singh's childhood memories. 
 In 2011, Singh was invited to Gourmet Abu Dhabi to showcase modern Indian cuisine.
 In 2011, Singh was listed invited as a guest speaker on Maharaja Express "A passage through India" with Allan Jenkins. 
 In 2012 Singh was invited to New York City for a week-long pop-up event at Desmond's NYC.
 In 2013 Singh was on the munchbox with Rachel Gabriells and Agni (the best team)
 In 2014 Singh was interviewed by Fine Dining TV to talk about recreating restaurant dishes at home

Charity work

In 2008, Singh became an ambassador for a rugby charity, Wooden Spoon that offers help to disadvantaged children. Singh raised funds with former rugby union stars Jason Leonard, Martin Offiah, Lee Mears and Nick Easter, through an event called Scrum Dine With Me.

Singh has worked with Action Against Hunger since 2002, and for the past four years has been hosting an annual Diwali Charity Event in their aid. He also supports Find Your Feet and helps out with yearly campaigns to raise awareness through the Curry for Change campaign. Singh works with The Prince's Trust charity, Mosaic Network, that aims to inspire young people from deprived communities to realise their talents and potential. Other charities include, the Asian Restaurants Skills Board that aims to attract new talent to the Indian restaurant sector through college courses, work experience placements and apprenticeships.

Controversy

In 2008, Singh was approached by Virgin Media to create the world's hottest dish to commemorate the launch of their Bollywood movie channel. Singh's entry caused quite a controversy as several curry house owners claimed that their curry was "the hottest". Singh responded by saying that although his dish made it into the Guinness book of world records, there is no real way to measure whose curry is the hottest as it depends on the taste buds of the individual eating it. The dish became known as The Bollywood Burner, and is possibly the most famous dish 'never' to be on a menu. Jonathan Ross tried the fiery dish on his Friday night show in July 2008. Steve Carell and a host of British stars also attempted to taste the dish.

Personal life

In May 1997, Singh married Archana in Bilaspur, India. They have two children together: Eshaan (born October 2001) and Maya (born in July 2006). Singh lives with his wife and two children in South London.

References

External links
 
Cinnamon Kitchen & Anise
Cinnamon Bazaar
My Kitchen Rules – Episode 39 (Channel 4), with guest judge Vivek Singh

1971 births
Living people
Chefs of Indian cuisine
Indian restaurateurs
Indian television chefs
British television chefs
English television chefs
Food Network chefs
Indian emigrants to the United Kingdom
Cookbook writers
People from Asansol